Wolfgang Schilling (9 June 1955 - 30 March 2018 ) was a professional German footballer.

Schilling made 235 appearances in the 2. Bundesliga during his playing career.

His managing career includes a spell at Berliner AK 07.

References

External links 
 

1955 births
2018 deaths
German footballers
Association football midfielders
Association football forwards
2. Bundesliga players
Arminia Bielefeld players
Tennis Borussia Berlin players
People from Rotenburg (district)